Susan Gregory van Keulen (born December 3, 1961) is a magistrate judge of the United States District Court for the Northern District of California.

Education
van Keulen received her undergraduate degree from the University of California Davis and her J.D. degree from UCLA School of Law.

Career
Upon graduation from law school, van Keulen practiced with the Thelen law firm for twenty years from 1988 to 2008. She then worked at the law firm of O'Melveny & Myers as a partner and later served as the Litigation Practice Leader of the firm's Silicon Valley office.

van Keulen's practice focused primarily on intellectual property cases in state and federal courts as well as in private arbitrations, with an emphasis on commercial and/or technology-based disputes involving computer, hardware, semiconductor and electronic technologies. She prepared numerous cases for trial and served as lead trial counsel in many cases within the Northern District of California. As an active part of her law practice, she represented pro bono clients in cases involving immigration law, landlord-tenant disputes and remedies for victims of domestic violence.

van Keulen served on the Northern District of California’s Patent Local Rules Advisory Subcommittee from 2006 to 2014 and has further written and lectured widely on patent law, antitrust law and federal procedure.

Federal judicial service
van Keulen was appointed on January 3, 2017. She filled the San Jose position vacated by former United States magistrate judge Paul Grewal, who left the bench to join Facebook in June 2016. Judge van Keulen's chambers are currently based in the San Jose division of the Northern District of California.

External links
The Honorable Susan van Keulen, U.S. Magistrate Judge, United States District Court for the Northern District of California
New Magistrate Judge Susan van Keulen Joins San Jose Division

References

1961 births
Living people
20th-century American lawyers
21st-century American lawyers
21st-century American judges
21st-century American women judges
American women lawyers
People from San Jose, California
UCLA School of Law alumni
University of California, Davis alumni
United States magistrate judges
20th-century American women